The 2002–03 season was the 117th season in the history of Luton Town Football Club. The club's promotion from the Third Division in the previous season meant they competed back in the Second Division, their 82nd consecutive year in the Football League. Luton finished in ninth place, though a poor late run of games prevented the club from reaching the play-offs.

After almost three seasons of financial security, the first signs of a new wave of problematic cracks began to appear in the club's infrastructure during the season, triggering a series of events which would eventually result in disastrous consequences. John Gurney's highly controversial takeover of the club in May and subsequent sacking of popular managerial duo Joe Kinnear and Mick Harford led to the establishment of a Supporters' Trust to protect the future of the club. A bizarre and farcical phone-vote poll organised by Gurney proved to be the method of picking a new manager to replace Kinnear, with ex-Hartlepool United boss and former Luton player Mike Newell allegedly winning the most votes on 23 June.

This article covers the period from 1 July 2002 to 30 June 2003.

Background

Joe Kinnear, appointed manager on 8 February 2001, had revived Luton's fortunes the previous season. A series of transfers had seen a complete turnaround in playing staff, making the squad unrecognisable from the one relegated from the Second Division two seasons previously. The team comfortably won promotion from the Third Division at the first attempt with the squad Kinnear had built, finishing as runners-up with 97 points and also ending the season as top scorers in the division. A key component of the squad, left winger Matthew Taylor, had been sold to Portsmouth for £400,000 at the end of the season.

In June 2002 Kinnear signed Tony Thorpe, who had scored 55 goals for Luton in a previous seven-year stint spanning 1992 to 1999, on a free transfer from Bristol City, whilst Northern Ireland international midfielder Steve Robinson was bought from Preston North End for £50,000.

Review

Pre-season
Very few transfer dealings were completed during pre-season, with key players having already signed contract extensions at the end of the previous season. Stuart Douglas, Richard Dryden, Adam Locke, Daryl Murphy and Scott Ward were all released, while four youth team players were given three-year scholar contracts, including Leon Barnett and Dean Brill. Jean-Louis Valois, a key player in the previous season, refused the offer of a new contract and left the club on 2 August to join Scottish Premier League club Hearts. Defender Alan Kimble, released from Wimbledon in the summer, signed a one-year contract with the club one week before the season started and, on 10 August, striker Robbie Winters signed a short-term deal from Scottish club Aberdeen.

August and September
The opening games saw Luton fall to four losses and a draw, conceding 13 goals, before claiming a first victory in a 3–0 win over Chesterfield, though this still left the club near the bottom of the table. Robbie Winters left the club after just one game – a 3–2 loss to Peterborough United. Left-back Sol Davis was signed from Swindon Town for a fee of £60,000 on 16 August, and goalkeeper Ben Roberts, who had previously had a loan spell at Luton in 2000, signed on a one-month loan from Charlton Athletic a week later.

September yielded an improvement in form as Luton finished the month two points above the relegation zone with eleven games played. Steve Howard continued his form from the previous season, netting seven goals in that time. On 10 September, Luton faced arch-rivals Watford in the League Cup – the first meeting between the two clubs in four years. In a game marred by violence between both sets of fans, Luton ran out 2–1 winners over the Hornets with goals from Matthew Spring, who scored a 25-yard strike that would later win Luton's Goal of the Season award, and Steve Howard. Luton were drawn to face Premier League side Aston Villa in the Second Round.

October and November
A goalkeeping injury crisis saw the arrival of Frenchman Cédric Berthelin on a two-month contract from Ligue 1 side Lens on 2 October. Berthelin was named in the squad on the same day as the League Cup game at Aston Villa, which Luton lost 3–0. He played in nine league games throughout October and November as Luton recorded five victories and three draws, with a single loss coming against Northampton Town. This left the Hatters just outside the play-off positions on goal difference.

Luton eased past Guiseley 4–0 in the FA Cup and recorded victories over Woking and Stevenage Borough in the Football League Trophy to reach the quarter-finals. The club were drawn against Cambridge United in the quarter-final of the Trophy, while Wigan Athletic were to be Luton's opponents in the Second Round of the FA Cup.

December and January
Goalkeeper Cédric Berthelin was offered a contract until the end of the season in late November. However, Joe Kinnear was later informed that, unless he trimmed his squad down, there would be no funds available to sign Berthelin or any other players. Kinnear admitted he was shocked at the sudden lack of money, which was partly due to the collapse of former Football League broadcaster ITV Digital, but made it clear that no players would be sold. This promise was affirmed later that day, with top scorer Steve Howard signing a two-year contract extension. Berthelin signed for First Division side Crystal Palace later that month.

A severely depleted Luton side was knocked out of the FA Cup on 7 December by Wigan and then, three days later, Cambridge United beat Luton 2–1 in extra time in the Football League Trophy. In the league, Luton recorded a loss, a draw and two wins to end December in sixth place in the table.

A loss to Chesterfield on New Year's Day turned out to be Luton's last game for almost three weeks due to poor weather. On 17 January, Kinnear revealed he had turned down the offer of an interview for the job of Irish national team manager. The next day, Luton beat Barnsley 3–2, despite being a goal down and having goalkeeper Carl Emberson sent off in the first half. A victory over Wycombe Wanderers a week later left Luton just outside the play-offs, though with games in hand over the teams above them.

Defender Chris Willmott, who started his career at Luton, joined the club on an initial month's loan from Wimbledon to ease a defensive injury crisis.

Meanwhile, developments off the pitch regarding a new stadium continued. Chairman Mike Watson-Challis revealed that he had bought a  piece of land off of Junction 10 of the M1 motorway close to Luton Airport. He estimated the cost of building a 15,000 seater stadium and complex to be £15 million, though admitted there "may be other costs". The meeting where Watson-Challis revealed these details also referenced potential hindrances to the developments – the removal of electricity pylons sitting on the land, the plans to widen the M1 at the same location as the stadium was to be built, and the vital fact that the development was yet to receive support from either Luton Borough Council or the Highways Agency.

February, March and April
On 7 February, striker Andrew Fotiadis, who had played for Luton all his career, was given a free transfer to Peterborough United. This freed up the funds to allow Kinnear to add to the squad; however, the player he wanted to sign, Australian striker Danny Allsopp, was injured on 8 February. Canadian international goalkeeper Lars Hirschfeld joined Luton on a one-month loan on 21 February from Tottenham Hotspur. He was an unused substitute as Luton lost their sixth home game of the season to Brentford a day later, severely denting their play-off hopes. One week later, with regular right-back Emmerson Boyce requiring surgery, Luton secured defender Duncan Jupp on a free transfer from Notts County on a contract until the end of the season. Only one win in six games followed in March, making automatic promotion almost impossible.

Chris Willmott's loan was extended to the end of the season in order to cover for various injuries on 13 March. Three days later, Kinnear released three youth players – Joe Deeney, Rob Gillman and James Osborn. Midfielder Lee Mansell, who had been a regular player in the team during Luton's relegation season two years previously, joined Football Conference club Nuneaton Borough on loan until the end of the season on 23 March. Later on the same day, Luton signed Reading midfielder Sammy Igoe on loan for the rest of the season. Luton picked up just three points from four matches in the first half of April, mathematically ruling them out of a play-off position and ensuring only a mid-table finish was possible.

On 21 April, the club's deputy chairman Eric Hood released a statement signalling the board's intention to have the new stadium, which was still yet to receive planning permission, built for the start of the 2005–06 season.

Luton's next game saw them emphatically beat Colchester United 5–0 away from home, Steve Howard scoring a hat-trick. The game saw youth team goalkeeper Rob Beckwith make his second appearance for the club. Kinnear admitted that the lack of available funds would likely see "seven or eight" players leaving the club in May, though stressed his desire to sign Willmott and Igoe on permanent contracts.

A 1–1 draw with Stockport County on 26 April left Luton in a mid-table position with one game left to play.

May
The season ended with a defeat to Swindon Town on 3 May, leaving Luton in ninth place in the table and fourteen points behind the play-offs. Young midfielder Michael Leary signed a two-year contract extension on 5 May.

A summer of turmoil at the club began on 20 May with chairman Mike Watson-Challis, who owned the land that the club was intending to build a new stadium on, retiring and an unknown consortium taking over the ownership of the club. Three days later the club announced that both Joe Kinnear and assistant manager Mick Harford had left the club, with no immediate reason given for their departures. An outpouring of confusion and anger from supporters forced a press conference from the new owners to reveal their identities. However, the proposed new chairman Roger Terrell and vice-chairman Lee Power admitted they had nothing to do with the investors nor the takeover process, confusing the situation further. They both confessed that, after seeing the reaction from the supporters of Luton, they were considering resigning after only one week. It was also during this press conference that some of Luton's financial difficulties were exposed, with a cut to the wage bill and other parts of the club necessary to fund the new stadium venture. To compound this, it was announced that Luton would not be renewing the contracts of six players – goalkeepers Carl Emberson and Mark Ovendale, defenders Duncan Jupp, Alan Kimble and Aaron Skelton, and striker Carl Griffiths were all released.

The new owners, still yet to be revealed, announced on 30 May that the process of finding a new manager would be handled through a phone-vote process, with supporters choosing their preferred candidate from a shortlist – a first of its kind in sport.

June
On 1 June, Roger Terrell and Lee Power released a statement which specified that they were severing any association with Luton Town, and wanted no involvement with the consortium. Two days later, the club revealed that a man named Peter Miller had been responsible for the removal of Joe Kinnear and Mick Harford from their jobs. It would later come to light that this was the same Peter Miller who was under employment at nearby club Northampton Town, breaching Football Association rules that state no single person can have an interest in more than one club. Stranger still, it was disclosed that Luton had entered into negotiations to re-hire Joe Kinnear and Mick Harford. Meanwhile, the FA commenced an investigation into Miller's actions.

With the situation at the club becoming more outlandish by the day, media reports highlighted businessman and property developer John Gurney as the man behind the takeover bid. It was later picked up that Gurney had previous history with leaving sports teams in dire financial situations, including non-League football clubs Farnborough Town and Southall, and rugby union club Bedford Blues, which alerted Luton supporters to the fact that their club could be inflicted with a similar fate. Gurney made his ownership public on 8 June and released two documents outlining his plans for the club. Within them, he defined his vision to build a Formula One track around a 50,000-seater stadium with a removable pitch that was supported over the top of the M1 motorway on concrete rafters, claimed the club could be making up to £100 million profit per year, and that it should change its name to 'London-Luton Football Club' to tie in with the local airport and make it more accessible to "customers" living in London. Gurney ended the documents with a plea for investors. Trust in Luton chairman Liam Day would later state that "if [the situation] wasn't so serious, it would have been hilarious." Gurney also raised the possibility of Luton merging with Wimbledon, a club over 40 miles away who were themselves in a poor financial state, in order to secure a position in the league above.

This uncertainty and the distinct possibility of liquidation for Luton Town, which was revealed to be losing £500,000 per month, in addition to the proposed destruction of the club's history, led to a group of supporters establishing a supporters' trust – Trust in Luton – to protect the future of the club and to give fans a unified voice to protest against the takeover. The Trust successfully convinced many supporters to vote with their feet and refuse to buy season tickets for the 2003–04 campaign, provoking a series of enraged statements from Gurney that were published in full on the club's website. The situation even went as far as UK Parliament, with Luton South MP Margaret Moran receiving support from Minister for Sport Richard Caborn to find a solution to the circumstances at the club.

On 23 June, Gurney announced the results from the phone-vote to find the next manager. He delayed the announcement for a re-count, as the results had allegedly been "so close". The eventual winner was revealed as former Hartlepool United manager and Luton player Mike Newell, who beat former manager Joe Kinnear by a reported four votes. However, it is widely believed that Kinnear won the vote by a significant margin, but refused to work with Gurney and turned the job down as a result. Newell expressed his desire to re-hire Mick Harford, who he had played with during his time at Luton, as assistant manager.

To make matters worse, on 26 June, it was revealed that none of the players or staff at the club had been paid their wages for May and June, which led to Gurney being summoned for a meeting with the Football League to explain the situation.

Match results
Luton Town results given first.

Legend

Friendlies

Football League Second Division
All results, goals, attendances etc. taken from Soccerbase and verified with official Luton Town match reports.

FA Cup

Football League Cup

Football League Trophy

League table

Player statistics
Last match played on 3 May 2003. Players with a zero in every column only appeared as unused substitutes.

Managerial statistics
Only competitive games from the 2002–03 season are included.

Awards
Awarded on 4 May 2003.

Transfers

In

Out

Loans in

Loans out

See also
List of Luton Town F.C. seasons

Footnotes

A.  Game part of the Isle of Man Tournament.
B.  The goal of the season was awarded as Matthew Spring's 25-yard strike against Watford on 10 September 2002.

References

Luton Town F.C. seasons
Luton Town